The Incredible Hulk, or Incredible Hulk, is a granitic summit with an elevation of  located in the Sierra Nevada mountain range, in Mono County of northern California, United States. The summit is set in Little Slide Canyon of the Hoover Wilderness, on land managed by Humboldt–Toiyabe National Forest, and is one mile outside the boundary of Yosemite National Park. The peak is situated approximately three miles southwest of Twin Lakes, three-quarters mile east of Kettle Peak, and 2.5 miles northwest of Matterhorn Peak. The nearest town is Bridgeport, 14 miles to the northeast. Incredible Hulk is the unofficial name of this landform, and will remain unofficial as long as the USGS policy of not adopting new toponyms in designated wilderness areas remains in effect.

Climbing

The first ascent of the summit was made September 6, 1936, by Bestor Robinson, Florence Robinson, Don Woods, and Carl Jensen.

Established rock climbing routes on the 1,200-foot-high walls of Incredible Hulk:

 The Donaldson Route –  – First Ascent 1970 by Greg Donaldson, Joe Kiskis, Bob Grow
 Mountaineers Route (Southwest Couloir) – class 4-5 – FA 1971 by Bob Grow, Joe Kiskis 
 Fallen Leaf – class 5.9 – FA 1970s by Mike Farrell, partner
 Red Dihedral – class 5.10 – FA 1975 by Dale Bard, Mike Farrell, Bob Locke
 Polish Route – class 5.10 – FA 1976 by Bob Harrington, Rick Wheeler
 Positive Vibrations – class 5.11b – FA 1981 by Bob Harrington, Alan Bartlett
 Astrohulk – class 5.11 – FA 1996 by Dave Nettle, Mike Davis
 Escape from Poland – class 5.10 – FA 1998 by Dave Nettle, John Fehrman
 Sun Spot Dihedral – class 5.11b – FA 1999 by Dave Nettle, Jimmy Haden
 Airstream – class 5.13 – FA 2004 by Peter Croft, Dave Nettle, Greg Epperson
 The Venturi Effect – class 5.13 – FA 2004 by Peter Croft, Dave Nettle
 Blowhard – class 5.12 – FA 2005 by Peter Croft, Andrew Stevens
 Solar Flare – class 5.12 – FA 2007 by Peter Croft, Conrad Anker
 Eye of the Storm – class 5.12 – FA 2007 by Nils Davis, Brent Obinger
 Sun Burn – class 5.12 – FA 2008 by Peter Croft, Dave Nettle
 Wind Shear – class 5.12 – FA 2016 by Peter Croft, Dave Nettle, Andy Puhvel
 Lenticular Gyrations – class 5.12 – FA 2016 by Aaron Cassebeer, Jeff Gicklhorn, Patrick O'Donnell

Red Dihedral (originally named "Yggdrasil") and Positive Vibrations are considered classic climbing routes in the Sierra Nevada.

Climate
According to the Köppen climate classification system, The Incredible Hulk is located in an alpine climate zone. Most weather fronts originate in the Pacific Ocean, and travel east toward the Sierra Nevada mountains. As fronts approach, they are forced upward by the peaks (orographic lift), causing moisture in the form of rain or snowfall to drop onto the range. Precipitation runoff from this rock feature drains to Robinson Creek which is a tributary of the Walker River.

See also

 Rock climbing

Gallery

References

External links
 Incredible Hulk rock climbing: Mountainproject.com
 Incredible Hulk weather forecast: climbingweather.com

Mountains of Mono County, California
North American 3000 m summits
Mountains of Northern California
Sierra Nevada (United States)
Humboldt–Toiyabe National Forest
Climbing areas of the United States